Gifford is an unincorporated community in McKean County, Pennsylvania, United States. The ZIP code is 16732.

Notable person
 Jim Owens, former Major League Baseball pitcher and long time pitching coach

References

Unincorporated communities in Pennsylvania
Unincorporated communities in McKean County, Pennsylvania